Acaenitinae is a subfamily of the parasitic wasp family Ichneumonidae. It is distributed on all continents except Antarctica, although only one specimen has ever been discovered in South America.  
Little is known of the Acaenitinae. The only reared species was a koinobiont endoparasitoid of a weevil. There are 24 genera. Hosts are believed to be Coleoptera larvae in wood. Female Acaenitinae have a large triangular projecting genital plate.

Genera

 Acaenitus
 Arotes
 Coleocentrus
 Hallocinetus
 Leptacoenites
 Mesoclistus
 Phaenolobus
 Procinetus

References

Further reading
Townes, H.K. (1971) Genera of Ichneumonidae, Part 4 (Cremastinae, Phrudinae, Tersilochinae, Ophioninae, Mesochorinae, Metopiinae, Anomalinae, Acaenitinae, Microleptinae, Orthopelmatinae, Collyriinae, Orthocentrinae, Diplazontinae). Memoirs of the American Entomological Institute 17: 1–372.

External links
Waspweb
Diagnostic characters

Ichneumonidae
Taxa named by Arnold Förster
Apocrita subfamilies